The Stakes is a podcast hosted by Kai Wright and produced by WNYC Studios.

Background 
The podcast focuses on a wide range of topics including public health, hip-hop, civil rights, and police violence. The podcast released an episode called "The Abortion Clinic That Won’t Go Quietly", which addressed the problem of having a single abortion provider in Alabama.

Reception 
The podcast was included on The Atlantic's list of "The 50 Best Podcasts of 2019".

References

External links 
 

Audio podcasts
2019 podcast debuts
2019 podcast endings
History podcasts
Political podcasts
WNYC Studios programs
American podcasts